Waraporn Boonsing (born 16 February 1990) is a Thai female international footballer who plays as a goalkeeper.

References

External links
 
 
 

1990 births
Living people
Waraporn Boonsing
2015 FIFA Women's World Cup players
Waraporn Boonsing
Footballers at the 2006 Asian Games
Footballers at the 2010 Asian Games
Footballers at the 2014 Asian Games
Waraporn Boonsing
Women's association football goalkeepers
Waraporn Boonsing
Waraporn Boonsing
Southeast Asian Games medalists in football
Competitors at the 2007 Southeast Asian Games
Competitors at the 2017 Southeast Asian Games
2019 FIFA Women's World Cup players
FIFA Century Club
Waraporn Boonsing
Competitors at the 2019 Southeast Asian Games
Waraporn Boonsing
Waraporn Boonsing